Nong Chang Khuen is a village and tambon (sub-district) of Mueang Lamphun District, in Lamphun Province, Thailand. In 2005 it had a population of 3925 people. The tambon contains six villages.

References

Tambon of Lamphun province
Populated places in Lamphun province